Pietro Micca (pennant number MC) was an Italian submarine which served with the Regia Marina in World War II.  She was the third ship named after Pietro Micca, the Savoyard soldier who became a national hero for his sacrifice in the defence of Turin against the French troops in 1706. This boat was the prototype for a class of fast, long range submarines with conventional torpedo armament, naval mine laying capability, and useful secret transport capacity.  The ship was built at the Tosi shipyard in Taranto.  She was laid down on 15 October 1931 and launched on 31 March 1935. The boat fully met design requirements, but was too expensive to be repeated.

Career
Pietro Micca was delivered to the Navy on 1 October 1935. The boat undertook two Spanish Civil War patrols in support of Francisco Franco on 23 January and 13 February 1937. As the largest Regia Marina submarine, Pietro Micca led the submarine fleet for the 5 May 1938, Naples naval parade to honor Adolf Hitler. Micca was at sea when Italy declared war, and laid a minefield off Alexandria on 12 June 1940. Micca returned to lay a second minefield off Alexandria on 12 August 1940. Italy kept the vessel in the Mediterranean Sea despite Kriegsmarine requests for temporary assignment to BETASOM to assist minelaying at Freetown, Cape Town, and Madagascar. There were 18 survivors.

Notes

References
 

 Kafka, Roger & Pepperburg, Roy L. (1946) Warships of the World Cornell Maritime Press

External links
 Sommergibili Marina Militare website

Submarines of the Regia Marina
Ships built in Taranto
Ships built by Cantieri navali Tosi di Taranto
1935 ships
World War II submarines of Italy
Ships sunk by British submarines
World War II shipwrecks in the Mediterranean Sea
Maritime incidents in July 1943
Submarines sunk by submarines